The 1979 Italian Open was a combined men's and women's tennis tournament that was played on outdoor clay courts at the Foro Italico in Rome, Italy. It was the 36th edition of the tournament. The men's tournament was part of the 1979 Colgate-Palmolive Grand Prix while the women's tournament, held separately for the first time, was part of the Colgate Series (Category AAA). The women's event was played from 7 May through 13 May 1979 while the men's event was organized from 21 May through 27 May 1979. After a final that lasted five hours and nine minutes second-seeded Vitas Gerulaitis won the men's singles title, his second Italian Open title after 1977, and the accompanying $28,000 first-prize money. The women's singles title was won by third-seeded Tracy Austin. In the semifinal Austin defeated compatriot Chris Evert-Lloyd which ended Evert-Lloyd's record 125-match winning streak on clay that had started in August 1973.

Finals

Men's singles
 Vitas Gerulaitis defeated  Guillermo Vilas 6–7, 7–6, 6–7, 6–4, 6–2

Women's singles
 Tracy Austin defeated  Sylvia Hanika 6–4, 1–6, 6–3

Men's doubles
 Peter Fleming /  Tomáš Šmíd defeated  José Luis Clerc /  Ilie Năstase 4–6, 6–1, 7–5

Women's doubles
 Betty Stöve /  Wendy Turnbull defeated  Evonne Goolagong /  Kerry Reid 6–3, 6–4

References

External links
International Tennis Federation (ITF) – Men's tournament details
International Tennis Federation (ITF) – Women's tournament details

Italian Open
Italian Open
Italian Open (tennis)
Italian Open (tennis)
Italian Open